Typhoon Cora, also known as the 2nd Miyako-jima Typhoon (第2宮古島台風) in Japan, was a typhoon that hit the Ryūkyū Islands in 1966.

Meteorological history

At 18:00 UTC on August 28, a tropical depression formed just to the east of the Northern Mariana Islands. Although initially drifting southeast, the depression began curving to the southwest early the next day. During the late night of August 29, it passed over the south tip of Guam and over the Cocos Lagoon. Early in the day on August 30, the depression slowed its course and began a gentle turn to the west-northwest. By 00:00 UTC on August 31, the depression attained tropical storm intensity and started moving northwest. Steadily strengthening as it did so, Tropical Storm Cora attained typhoon intensity by 00:00 UTC on September 1. Having intensified significantly, Typhoon Cora progressively decreased its forward speed and bent back to the west-northwest over the next 36 hours. During this period, Typhoon Cora attained peak winds equal to those of a minimal Super Typhoon on the Joint Typhoon Warning Center's classification scale. On the night of September 4, Typhoon Cora began yet another turn to the west-northwest and intensified into what is equivalent of a Category 5 typhoon on the Saffir-Simpson Hurricane Scale; however, the classification did not exist until the scale was first devised in the 1970s and then used retroactively to rate past storms.

After making landfall, Typhoon Cora quickly lost typhoon intensity and curved to the northeast. It passed near Jinhua, Hangzhou, and Suzhou; by the time it was nearest Suzhou, it was already a remnant low. On September 8, the remnant low turned to the northeast, over the East China Sea, and approached the Korean Peninsula. Shortly after 06:00 UTC on September 9, it struck South Chungcheong Province in the Republic of Korea. Dissipation took place inland, six hours later.

Preparations and impact

As the typhoon approached Okinawa Island, flights to the island were cancelled for five days, stranding about 1,000 U.S. Marines in South Vietnam. The Marines were due to arrive on Okinawa, their staging area, but instead were sent to a camp in Da Nang, part of South Vietnamese territory in 1966.

In the southern Ryukyu Islands, Typhoon Cora was considered the most destructive typhoon in at least 75 years. There, the powerful winds and waves of the storm destroyed 520 homes on the islands of Miyako-jima and Ishigaki. The worst damage occurred on Miyako-jima; the storm also damaged 1,400 homes, leaving 2,363 people homeless. The majority of these were wooden structures whose structures were compromised once their roof was torn off. Steel structures also sustained considerable damage while reinforced concrete buildings fared the best. The peak gust is still the official highest wind speed ever recorded in Japan. The lowest pressure on Miyako-jima island, was recorded at 10:01 a.m. local time on September 5. In all,  of rain fell during Typhoon Cora. Additionally, up to five five-ton ships were destroyed and four others reported damaged. The powerful storm, while at peak intensity near Miyako-jima, also destroyed one of two radar bases there, and significant damage to crops was reported; later estimates indicated 70% of the sugar cane on the island was destroyed. Total losses on Miyako-jima and Ishigaki reached $30 million (1966 USD). Only five injuries were reported after Cora.

Slowly moving by the southern Ryukyu Islands, Cora battered the region for more than 30 hours. The resulting effects rendered 6,000 residents homeless. The scale of damage varied across the island with Ueno-mura suffering the most extensive losses. Of the community's 821 homes, 90.1 percent was severely damaged or destroyed. A United States Air Force radar station was destroyed on the island. On nearby Ishigaki Island, where wind gusts reached , 71 homes were destroyed while a further 139 were severely damaged.

On nearby Taiwan (then called Formosa), Typhoon Cora produced strong winds along the north coast of the island. Peak winds in Taipei reached . Wind gusts up to  caused notable damage in Taiwan, with 17 homes destroyed and 42 more damaged. Three people were killed during Cora's passage while seventeen others sustained injury. Additionally, 5,000 persons were evacuated. Damage amounted to NT$4.2 million. Striking Fujian Province, China, on the heels of Typhoon Alice, Cora exacerbated damage in the region. Property damage was extreme with more than 21,000 homes destroyed and nearly 63,000 more damage. An estimated 265,000 people were severely affected by the storm. A total of 269 people perished during the storm while a further 2,918 were injured; 52 people were also listed missing.

The JMA in Japan named the typhoon 2nd Miyako-jima Typhoon.

See also 

 Typhoon Sarah (1959) - the JMA named it Miyakojima Typhoon
 Typhoon Della (1968) - the JMA named it 3rd Miyakojima Typhoon

References

External links 

History of Okinawa Prefecture
Typhoons in Japan
1966 Pacific typhoon season
Miyako Islands